Caligo beltrao, the purple owl, is a butterfly of the family Nymphalidae. The species can be found in Brazil.

The wingspan is about 120 mm.

The larvae feed on Canna indica, Calathea zebrina, Musa species, and Hedychium coronarium.

References

Caligo
Fauna of Brazil
Nymphalidae of South America
Taxa named by Johann Karl Wilhelm Illiger
Butterflies described in 1801